Utivarachna is a genus of Asian araneomorph spiders in the family Trachelidae first described by Kyukichi Kishida in 1940. It was largely ignored until Christa L. Deeleman-Reinhold revised the sac and ground spiders in 2001, transferring some species from Trachelas and adding several new ones. The genus was further expanded in 2014 and 2015.

Species
 it contains seventeen species in southeast Asia:
Utivarachna accentuata (Simon, 1896) – Sri Lanka
Utivarachna arcuata Zhao & Peng, 2014 – China
Utivarachna bucculenta Deeleman-Reinhold, 2001 – Thailand
Utivarachna chamaeleon Deeleman-Reinhold, 2001 – Borneo
Utivarachna dusun Deeleman-Reinhold, 2001 – Borneo
Utivarachna fabaria Zhao & Peng, 2014 – China
Utivarachna fronto (Simon, 1906) – India
Utivarachna fukasawana Kishida, 1940 (type) – Borneo
Utivarachna gongshanensis Zhao & Peng, 2014 – China
Utivarachna gui (Zhu, Song & Kim, 1998) – China
Utivarachna ichneumon Deeleman-Reinhold, 2001 – Borneo
Utivarachna kinabaluensis Deeleman-Reinhold, 2001 – Borneo
Utivarachna lata Jin, Yin & Zhang, 2015 – China
Utivarachna phyllicola Deeleman-Reinhold, 2001 – Thailand, Indonesia (Sumatra, Borneo)
Utivarachna rama Chami-Kranon & Likhitrakarn, 2007 – Thailand
Utivarachna rubra Deeleman-Reinhold, 2001 – Borneo
Utivarachna taiwanica (Hayashi & Yoshida, 1993) – Taiwan

References

Araneomorphae genera
Fauna of Southeast Asia
Spiders of Asia
Trachelidae
Taxa named by Kyukichi Kishida